Cotton House may refer to:

Thomas James Cotton House, Dardanelle, Arkansas, listed on the NRHP in Yell County, Arkansas
Dr. J.O. Cotton House, Leslie, Arkansas, NRHP-listed, listed on the NRHP in Searcy County, Arkansas
Cotton-Ropkey House, Indianapolis, Indiana, listed on the NRHP in Marion County, Indiana
Cotton-Smith House, Fairfield, Maine, listed on the NRHP in Somerset County, Maine
Dr. Charles Cotton House, Newport, Rhode Island, NRHP-listed
Cotton House (Green Bay, Wisconsin), listed on the NRHP in Brown County, Wisconsin, included within Heritage Hill State Historical Park
Cotton House (St. Vincent and the Grenadines) -luxury resort